Cottage Grove is an unincorporated community in Center Township, Union County, in the U.S. state of Indiana.

History
A post office was established at Cottage Grove in 1848, and remained in operation until it was discontinued in 1951.

Geography

References

Unincorporated communities in Union County, Indiana
Unincorporated communities in Indiana